Malmö FF competed in Division 2 Södra for the 1930–31 season. They won the league and were promoted to the first-tier league Allsvenskan for the first time in the club's history.

Club

Other information

References
 

Malmö FF seasons
Malmo FF